The Yale Bulldogs men's soccer program represents Yale University in all NCAA Division I men's college soccer competitions. Founded in 1908, the Bulldogs compete in the Ivy League. The Bulldogs are coached by Kylie Stannard, who was hired as the program's head coach in 2014. Yale plays their home matches at Reese Stadium, on the campus of Yale University.

Roster

Coaching history 
Yale University has had fifteen coaches in their program's existence.

Seasons

NCAA Tournament history 

Yale has appeared in seven NCAA Tournaments. Their most recent appearance came in 2019.

Rivalries 

Yale's main rivals are Harvard and Princeton.

Team honors

Varsity national championships 
Yale has won six men's varsity soccer national championships, all of which were national championships prior to the NCAA Division I Men's Soccer Tournament. In 1908, 1912, 1928, 1930, 1935, 1945, they were determined as national champions by the Intercollegiate Soccer Football Association (ISFA) and the American Soccer History Archives (ASHA).

Club national championships 
The club team was retroactively declared national champions by ASHA in 1875.

References

External links
 

 
1908 establishments in Connecticut
Soccer clubs in Connecticut